Saltonia is a monotypic genus of North American cribellate araneomorph spiders in the family Dictynidae containing the single species, Saltonia incerta. It was first described by R. V. Chamberlin & Wilton Ivie in 1942, and has only been found in United States. Originally placed with the funnel weavers, it was moved to the Dictynidae in 1967.

It is a rare spider only known from the shores of the Salton Sea in California, United States. It occurs among salt-crusts in several dry or intermittent lake-beds, and from a small island in the Gulf of California. All specimens were collected during March and April near salt springs, salt water, or salt marshes.

Its colulus is similar to that of two genera of intertidal zone spiders of the family Desidae, Paratheuma and Desis. Genetic evidence suggests it is closely related to Paratheuma and the fully aquatic species Argyroneta aquatica.

References

Further reading
 Banks, N. (1898). Some new spiders. Canad. Ent. 30:185-188.
 Chamberlin, R. V. & W. Ivie. (1942). A hundred new species of American spiders. Bull. Univ. Utah 32(13):1-117.
 Roth, V.D. & Brown W.L. (1975). Comments on the spider Saltonia incerta Banks (Agelenidae?). J. Arachnol. 3:53-56. PDF

Dictynidae
Endemic fauna of California
Monotypic Araneomorphae genera
Spiders of the United States
Taxa named by Ralph Vary Chamberlin
Taxa named by Wilton Ivie